, born , was a Japanese actor. In 1947, he made his film debut with Akira Kurosawa's One Wonderful Sunday. He often worked with Akira Kurosawa and Kihachi Okamoto.

Filmography

Films

 One Wonderful Sunday (1947) as Ticket seller
 Drunken Angel (1948) as Guitarist
 Stray Dog (1949) as Spectator of theater 
 Aoi sanmyaku (1949)
 Bōryoku no Machi (1950)
 Aoi Shinju (1951) as Yanagiya
 Vendetta for a Samurai (1952) 
 Nangoku no hada (1952) 
 The Man Who Came to Port (1952)
 Ikiru (1952) as Gang
 Eagle of the Pacific (1953) 
 Seven Samurai (1954) as a coolie
 Godzilla (1954) as Hagiwara
 Half Human (1955) as Nakata
 Samurai II: Duel at Ichijoji Temple (1955) as Matahachi Honiden
 Throne of Blood (1957) as Washizu's vassal
 Song for a Bride (1958) as Kurokawa
 The Hidden Fortress (1958) as Ashigaru
 Life of an Expert Swordsman (1959)
 The Secret of the Telegian (1960) as Taki
 Storm Over the Pacific (1960) 
 The Story of Osaka Castle (1961) as Kai Hayami
 Yojimbo (1961) as Ashigaru
 Sanjuro (1961) as Ashigaru
 Gorath (1962) as Physician
 King Kong vs. Godzilla (1962) as Obayashi, Mr. Tako's Assistant
 King Kong Escapes (1967) as Kazuo Suzuki (Dr. Who's Henchmen)
 Japan's Longest Day (1967)
 All Monsters Attack (1969) as Kobayashi
 Samurai Banners (1969) as Yamagata Masakage
 Red Lion (1969) as Kesagi
 The Vampire Doll (1970) as Taxi driver
 Space Amoeba (1970) as the magazine editor
 Battle of Okinawa (1971)
 The Human Revolution (1973)
 Lupin III: Strange Psychokinetic Strategy (1974) as Security chief
 Blue Christmas (1978) as Taxi driver
 Zatoichi (1989) 
 Dreams (1990)
 Rhapsody in August (1991)

Television
 Daichūshingura (1971) as Wasuke
 Hissatsu Shikakenin (1972) (ep.24) as Shinbei Tajima
 Hissatsu Shiokinin (1973) (ep.15) as Yasuke
 Shinsho Taikōki (1973) as Matsunaga Hisahide
 Taiyō ni Hoero! (1974) (ep.126) as Urabayashi
 Tasukenin Hashiru (1974) (ep.35) as Gunpei
 Kurayami Shitomenin (1975) (ep.26) as Matsugoro
 Hissatsu Shiokiya Kagyō (1975) (ep.6) as Kisuke
 Hissatsu Shiwazanin (1975) (ep.28) as Sanji
 Daitsuiseki (1978) (ep.8) 
 Edo Professional Hissatsu Shōbainin (1978) (ep.10) as Tenmanya
 The Fierce Battles of Edo (1979) (ep.8) as Kamekichi
 Hissatsu Shigotonin (1982) (ep.10) as Matsug
 Hissatsu Shigotonin III (1980) (ep.45) as Rihei
 Onihei Hankachō (1990) (ep.22) as Kaneya Iemon

References

Japanese male film actors
20th-century Japanese male actors
1925 births
1998 deaths